Living is a 1971 live album by American singer and songwriter Judy Collins, released by Elektra Records in 1971. The album is taken from performances on the singer's 1970 concert tour. It peaked at No. 64 on the Billboard 200 charts.

In addition to Collins' own work, the album includes songs by Bob Dylan, Joni Mitchell and Leonard Cohen, as well as a song co-written with Stacy Keach.

Track listing
Side one
 "Joan of Arc" (Leonard Cohen) – 5:55
 "Four Strong Winds" (Ian Tyson) – 3:45
 "Vietnam Love Song" (Arnold Black, Eric Bentley) –  3:56
 "Innisfree" (W.B. Yeats, Hamilton Camp) – 3:16
 "Song for Judith (Open the Door)" (Judy Collins) – 4:05

Side two
 "All Things Are Quite Silent" (Arranged and adapted by Collins) – 2:47
 "Easy Times" (Stacy Keach, Collins) – 3:25
 "Chelsea Morning"  (Joni Mitchell) – 3:15
 "Famous Blue Raincoat" (Cohen) – 5:34
 "Just Like Tom Thumb's Blues" (Bob Dylan) – 6:45

Personnel

 Judy Collins – piano (tracks 2, 4–5), acoustic guitar (tracks 1, 3, 6, 8–9), vocals

Additional musicians
 Ry Cooder – second guitar (track 2), electric guitar (tracks 5, 10), acoustic guitar (track 7)
 Susan Evans – drums and percussion (tracks 1, 3, 6, 8–9), vocals
 Gene Taylor – bass (tracks 1, 3, 6, 8–9), vocals
 Richard Bell – piano (tracks 1, 3, 6, 8–9), vocals

Chorus singers on "Song for Judith"
 Nancy Carlen, Randy Nauert, Fritz Richmond, Bob Zachary, Cheryl, Eileen, Elizabeth Thompson, Susan Evans, Richard Bell, Gene Taylor, Jac Holzman, Vanessa Chartoff, John Cooke
 Big Sur Choir: Ruth Stevens, Rita Gatti, Tom Carvey, Paul Johnson, Glenda Bickel

Technical
 Mark Abramson – producer
 John Haeny – engineer
 Bill Harvey – cover design
 Peter Lerner – cover photo
 Judy Collins – collage design
 Wally Heider – remote recording facilities

References

Judy Collins live albums
Albums produced by Mark Abramson
1971 live albums
Elektra Records live albums